The United States national quidditch team is the official quidditch team of the United States. The team is regulated by US Quidditch and is a national member of the International Quidditch Association. The team has won the most IQA World Cup titles, winning the 2012, 2014, and 2018 titles. The USNT only competes in events once every two years; at the IQA World Cup, as it is geographically ineligible for the only other current international Quidditch event; the IQA European Games.

History

The United States national team was formed in time for the 2012 Summer Games - the first Quidditch event to be contested by national teams. The event was held in the United Kingdom to coincide with the Torch Relay for the 2012 Olympic Games. The United States, who had invented the sport in 2005 at Middlebury College and who had been refining it for years before any other nation had taken it up, were heavy favorites. The tournament was contested between only five countries; the United States, United Kingdom, Canada, Australia and France of which only four had fully established Quidditch programs by that point: the United Kingdom had only a handful of teams and their squad was drawn from whichever players were available to attend. The tournament format consisted of a round robin of all five teams, after which the 5th placed team would be eliminated and the rest would contest the bracket. The United States went undefeated in the Round Robin, comfortably defeating every team and only being actively challenged on the scoreboard by France - who held them to two goals out of SWIM range before the USA caught the snitch to win 90*-10. In bracket play the US beat Australia before defeating France again, this time by a very comfortable margin of 160*-0 to win gold. Team USA also played a further exhibition match against hosts Team UK to coincide with the torch relay, which the US won 200*-60.

The USA would defend their title in the second iteration of what is now the IQA World Cup; the 2014 IQA Global Games in Burnaby, Canada. The tournament had expanded to 7 teams from the original five, with Belgium and Mexico being added. Italy had planned to attend but were forced to drop out due to travel costs. The tournament format consisted of a round robin, followed by an immediate series of finals - removing the bracket from the previous tournament. The United States continued their comfortable winning streak, winning 5 of their round robin matches outright and benefitting from the voluntary forfeiture of the small and injury-laden Belgian team late into the day. This qualified the United States for the final, alongside second-placed Australia. The final was a whitewash, with the USA once again running out the comfortable victors in a shutout 230*-0 victory.

The 2016 IQA World Cup in Frankfurt, Germany would prove a pivotal moment for the USNT. Heavy favorites once again, the USA took part in an event much-expanded from the previous iteration. With 23 competing nations following a veritable explosion in the sport's growth worldwide. Owing to travel difficulties in getting the national team together in one place to train, the USNT trained together for the first and only time the day before the tournament began, instead relying on the relatively dominant playstyle of their individual players and the chemistry built up by the waves of chasers and beaters who played for the same, or nearby, teams in US Quidditch and Major League Quidditch domestic games. The event followed a pool-play and bracket format, with the USA seeded into Pool 5 alongside Norway, Germany and Brazil - all nations who had begun competing internationally since the USA's last outing. The United States won the pool easily, dominating their opponents by wide margins. This preceded a comprehensive defeat of Catalonia 270*-10 in the round of 16, which was itself followed by a much rockier beating of Belgium 130*-50 in the Quarter Final. This match marked the only time the USA had been held close to SWIM since 2012 - once again being only two goals clear of range. The semi-final against the United Kingdom saw the USA fall 20-0 down rapidly, as the UK outplayed them in the opening stages of the game, spurred on by scores of fans who had travelled from Britain. This was not to last however, and the United States rapidly regained control of the match and ran out to an eventual 140*-40 victory - though still a far cry from the dominant performances of years past. The final saw the United States play against Australia, a repeat of the 2014 final. Unlike the United States, the Australian team, 'The Dropbears' had arrived in Germany a week early and trained rigorously. Most of their players had been drawn from teams in and around Sydney and Melbourne and were all intimately familiar with each other. The final was extremely closely contested as a result, with neither side able to decisively outplay the other. A snitch catch by the USA's Margo Aleman was  ruled out for a charge on the snitch, allowing Australia's Dameon Osbourne to catch the snitch, which won Australia the match, 150*-130, and thus the tournament. This marked the first and only time the United States had ever lost a Quidditch match.

The 2018 IQA World Cup is set to be held in Florence, Italy in July. The United States team, coached by 2014 and 2016 veteran Michael Parada and captained by Augustine Monroe (who played for the 2012 team), is composed largely of Texas and Massachusetts based players. The squad, whose marketing has been dominated by the hashtag #RedeemTeam2018 is once again heavily touted to win the gold, having drawn higher proportions of players from a smaller list of very elite teams, to create a squad more familiar with each other. Competition is expected from a higher proportion of teams than the previous tournament however, with Australia still touted to make the final and the United Kingdom, crowned European Champions at the expense of France in 2017, are also expected to challenge US dominance off the back of arguably the best snitch-on-pitch gameplay in the world amongst their elite teams. The event is expected to have 32 teams in attendance, including newcomers New Zealand, Malaysia, Hong Kong and the Czech Republic as well as teams who debuted at the 2017 IQA European Games making their first World Cup outing, such as Sweden.

Competitive record

Players
Where a player's club is listed, the information is accurate at the time of their representation for the event in question. The clubs listed in the 'current national squad' section are accurate for the current season. Where these names have changed over time, the name is given as the club is known now.

Players who represent, or have represented, the US national team are as follows;

Current National Squad
The following players competed at the 2018 IQA World Cup in Florence in June 2018, coached by Michael "Yada" Parada.

Squad: World Cup 2012 (Oxford, UK)
The following players competed at the World Cup in Oxford in Summer 2012, placing first of five.

See also

 Australian Quidditch Association
 International Quidditch Association
 Sport in Australia
 Quidditch (sport)

References

External links

Quidditch national teams
Quidditch
Sports clubs established in 2005
2005 establishments in the United States